Spider is an unincorporated community located in Knott County, Kentucky, United States. Its post office was established in 1910, and closed in 1957.

References

Unincorporated communities in Knott County, Kentucky
Unincorporated communities in Kentucky